Chief Johnny Bob Smallboy (7 November 1898 - 8 July 1984), also Robert or Apitchitchiw, was a community leader who brought national attention to problems faced by urban and reserve Indians of when he "returned to the land" with followers from troubled Canadian Indian reservations.

He was born on the Peigan Nation, SW of Fort Macleod, Alta on 7 November 1898, of a traditional Cree family who were among the last to settle on their allotted reserve at Hobbema in central Alberta. A Treaty 6 nation location between Calgary and Edmonton and located on oil and gas reserves. Smallboy became a hunter, trapper, farmer, and eventually chief of the Ermineskin Band from 1959 to 1969. In 1968, to escape deteriorating social and political conditions on the reserve, he moved to a bush camp on the Kootenay Plains. He attributed the alcoholism, drug abuse and suicide that he saw in his community to living modern lives on the reserve. Accompanied by approximately 125 people and with help from other elders he moved his community. Despite factional splits, the return of many residents to Hobbema, and the group's failure to obtain permanent land tenure, Smallboy Camp persisted into the 1980s as a working community used as a retreat by Plains and Woodlands Indians from western Canada and the US.

Smallboy received the Order of Canada in 1979.

Early life

Smallboy was born in 1898. He was named Kesayo (Bobtail) by his famous Grand Father (Bobtail).  An Order of Canada Certificate and Medical Scholarship established in his honour are both in the name of Robert Smallboy and Smallboy (Cree name Apitchitchiw). A baptism certificate names the chief as "Johnny Smallboy". He married Louisa Headman in Hobbema at Our Lady of the Seven Sorrows Church 1918. Smallboy was descended from two great families of the Cree Nation. He inherited his natural ability for the leadership from Big Bear & Bobtail. He was a farmer 1920s.

Smallboy Camp or Mountain Cree Camp

Smallboy became Chief of the Ermineskin Cree Nation in 1959. He led a delegation to Ottawa after becoming a chief. He used this opportunity to address with the Canadian Government about the problems of his people. The issues that he laid out were: a need for more land, unemployment, the breaking down of family units, rampant alcoholism, child neglect was common, and children were performing poorly in school. There was great loss of pride, dignity, religion, and social order. This left people with little meaning in their lives, his pleas for help fell on deaf ears. As oil development and modernization engulfed his reserve, Chief Smallboy was saddened by the increasing use of alcohol and drugs, his people's loss of language due to television and their movement away from traditional rituals and medicines.

As oil revenue increased, people gave up farming. While domestic disputes, suicides and traffic deaths increased dramatically Chief Smallboy could only find one solution and that was to take his followers away from this harmful environment and to embrace a more natural way of life. Based upon the principles of his Forefathers, he made a decision to abandon the Ermineskin Reserve for the future of his children and grandchildren and for a good, peaceful life for them in a place far from the evil influences of the modern world.
In the summer of 1968, Chief Small Boy, together with Simon Omeasoo, Lazarus Roan, Alex Shortneck, and some 140 people left the Ermineskin Reserve. They established a camp in the wilderness of the Kootenay Plains near the Rocky Mountains. They pitched a large council teepee, twenty tents and a portable classroom. They had no intention of reverting to the role of nomadic plains men. But sought isolation, while at the same time providing an acceptable level of education for their children. Chief Smallboy was adamant in maintaining the integrity of his camp and successfully avoided government efforts to close it down.

The camp was inspiration to other Indigenous people in Canada and the United States and became a centre for learning about Cree Spiritual life. While there were disagreements and break aways, Chief Smallboy was the undisputed chief. Smallboy camp was constituted under the Pearson administration and led directly to Smallboy and his followers abandoning their reserve at Hobbema and moving to the Kootenay Plains. ‘The treaty process had been a fraud,’ Chief Smallboy declared, this land has not been ceded to queen Victoria, the collected chiefs, who signed Treaty Six, in 1876 and Treaty Seven in 1877, had no idea what they were giving up land in the treaty 6 & 7. The undeveloped crown lands east of the Rocky mountains, where he then residing had not been included in Treaty six or Treaty seven. The Federal Government sees the camp as occupying crown land. David Thompson had recognized that the Kootenay Plains were Sacred Indian Land. Despite the inclusion of that strip of land, as the anomalous panhandle of treaty eight, it remained sacred Indian land. It would be occupied by Smallboy‘s Band and any Indian who chose to follow. It was in 1968 that Chief Smallboy pitched his tent along with another dozen tents and tee pees on the Kootenay Plains North of Abraham Lake.

In 1970s the Smallboy Camp split into two, one – third of the membership following Joseph Mackinaw to the Buck Lake Region, which is in the boundaries of Treaty 6. The 1970s death of Simon Omeasoo and Lazarus Roan made a number of their relatives return to Hobbema. The remaining members of Smallboy band retained their status in the Ermineskin Band. They were not deprived of their share of the oil royalties that occurred in 1970’s & 1980's and gave each member of Ermineskin Band, man, woman, & child five hundred dollars a month. Smallboy had initially taken his band to the foothills to help alleviate poverty, however the Ermineskin band soon became the richest band in the land.

Legacy and Artistic Tributes 
In 1996, Tony Isaacs of the Taos, New Mexico based label Indian House Records traveled to the remote location of the Smallboy Camp to make sound recordings.

Visual artist Joane Cardinal-Schubert created several artworks related to Smallboy and the tragedy of his death. Cardinal-Schubert also wrote a poem about Smallboy's death.

Kisiko Awasis Kiskinhamawin in Mountain Cree Camp 
The Mountain Cree Camp School was established on the Smallboy Camp in 1967. The school was not recognized by the province of Alberta or the Federal Government until 2009. Starting in 2005, Alberta Education started negotiations to establish a program with the school. In 2009, a formal agreement was struck by Alberta Education for the Edmonton Catholic School Board to provide educational support to the school.

Death 
On a visit to Banff in the winter of 1984 Chief Smallboy was refused from several hotels and had to stay the night outdoors. He suffered frostbite in his feet, which eventually led to gangrene and ultimately caused Smallboy’s death months later on July 8, 1984 at Smallboy Camp near Nordegg, Alta.

References

 Johnny Bob Smallboy at The Canadian Encyclopedia, accessed August 31, 2019

1898 births
1984 deaths